The Church of St. Frances de Chantal is a Roman Catholic parish church under the authority of the Roman Catholic Archdiocese of New York, located at Harding Avenue at Throggs Neck Blvd., Bronx, New York City. The parish was established in 1927.

The present Brutalist-style church structure was built 1971 to designs by Paul W. Reilly. Colorful chunks of stained glass are set directly into the concrete in the style of the then-contemporary European post-war stained-glass work. Larry Lawton was once an altar boy there.

The abstract style stained glass in the church was designed by Albinas Elksus.  Correct spelling is Albinas Elskus. [1926-2007]

Clergy and Staff
 Rev. Stephen A. Asomah - Administrator
 Rev. Dennis Iddamalgoda, O.M.I. - Parochial Vicar
 Rev. Michael McDonnell, OFM - Weekend Assistant
 Deacon George Coppola 
 Sr. Joan Marie O’Leary, O.P. - Pastoral Associate 
 Ms. Christi Chiapetti - Cantor/Coordinator of Religious Education

References 

Christian organizations established in 1927
Roman Catholic churches completed in 1971
Brutalist architecture in New York City
Roman Catholic churches in the Bronx
Throggs Neck, Bronx
20th-century Roman Catholic church buildings in the United States